The 29th European Men's Artistic Gymnastics Championships was held from 21 to 25 April 2010 at the National Indoor Arena in Birmingham. The senior and junior events are different. During the senior's qualification the top eight teams progress to the team final, and the top eight gymnasts (two per nation maximum) on each apparatus qualify for the individual finals. After the qualification for the juniors the team medals and places are awarded. Unlike the seniors in this event the top 24 gymnasts (two per nation maximum) compete in the all around final.

Oldest and youngest competitors

Timetable

Medal winners

Detail results

Seniors

Team 

Oldest and youngest competitors

Floor 

Oldest and youngest competitors

Pommel horse 

Oldest and youngest competitors

Rings 

Oldest and youngest competitors

Vault 

Oldest and youngest competitors

Parallel bars 

Oldest and youngest competitors

Horizontal bar 

Oldest and youngest competitors

Juniors

All round 

Oldest and youngest competitors

 source =

Floor 

Oldest and youngest competitors

Pommel horse 

Oldest and youngest competitors

Rings 

Oldest and youngest competitors

Vault 

Oldest and youngest competitors

Parallel bars 

Oldest and youngest competitors

Horizontal bar

Parallel bars 

Oldest and youngest competitors

Medal count

Combined

Seniors

Juniors

External links
 
 Official results (UEG-Gymnastics.com) 

2010
Artistic Gymnastics
International sports competitions in Birmingham, West Midlands
European Men's Artistic Gymnastics Championships
European Men's Artistic Gymnastics Championships
European Men's Artistic Gymnastics Championships
European Men's Artistic Gymnastics Championships
2010s in Birmingham, West Midlands
April 2010 sports events in the United Kingdom